Arthur Richard Black (18 February 1907 – unknown) was a Scottish footballer. His regular position was as a forward. He was born in Airdrie.  He played for Stenhousemuir, Blantyre Victoria, Greenock Morton, St Mirren, and Manchester United.

References

External links
MUFCInfo.com profile

1907 births
Scottish footballers
Manchester United F.C. players
Stenhousemuir F.C. players
Greenock Morton F.C. players
St Mirren F.C. players
Year of death missing
Blantyre Victoria F.C. players
Footballers from Airdrie, North Lanarkshire
Association football forwards
English Football League players
Scottish Football League players
Airdrieonians F.C. (1878) players